In Catalan mythology, Nitus are small matter, impossible to describe by their smallness, which fall into a person's ear and go to the brain. They do not kill, but are said to feed like maggots on the memory and create tiredness and forgetfulness. His female equivalent is the faluga.

Catalan legendary creatures